Jewel Raja Shaikh (born 19 January 1990) is an Indian professional footballer who plays as a central midfielder for South United in the I-League 2nd Division.

Career

Early career
Born in Budge Budge, Kolkata, Jewel though had a keen interest in cricket and wanted to become a cricketer when he was younger but chose to play football professionally. Initially playing as a winger for his youth teams, primarily on the right, he was encouraged to become a central midfielder by his father. Jewel joined the Pujali Athletic Club as a youngster and later joined the Sports Authority of India's eastern center in Kolkata, and then was selected to be a part of IFA's academy at Haldia.

ONGC
He then appeared for the Bengal under-19 football team and then India U19s despite only being 16 and soon joined ONGC in the I-League in 2007 but didn't make any appearance for the Mumbai based club as he was heavily involved on national duty for the majority of his time there.

Dempo
Jewel continued his progress with age group teams of India at national level and was offered a contract by Dempo of I-League in 2008 but struggled for game time in a talented Dempo side and only made his I-League debut in a substitute appearance against Churchill Brothers.

Pailan Arrows
Jewel was signed up by Pailan Arrows for the 2010–11 season but again was more involved with the national team than with his club side.

Mohun Bagan
Jewel signed for Mohun Bgan on 25 July 2011 and on 23 October 2011, registered his first assist for the Mariners against his former club Pailan Arrows. He then scored his first goal for Bagan in a 5–1 victory over Mumbai on 6 November 2011. Jewel scored against ONGC from a Tolgay Özbey pass on 63rd minute in a 3-1 win for his team

Dempo
On 30 May 2013, Jewel rejoined Dempo after spending two seasons with Mohun Bagan. He played his first match since his return in the I-League on 22 September 2013 against Shillong Lajong at the Duler Stadium, playing 65 minutes before being replaced by Joy Ferrao as Dempo lost the match 0–3.

Jewel represented FC Goa during the 2014 Indian Super League season and made 9 appearances and scoring once.

Atlético de Kolkata
In July 2015 Jewel was drafted to play for Atlético de Kolkata in the 2015 Indian Super League.

International
Jewel scored in his first goal for the Indian U23s against Singapore U23 at the 2010 Asian Games. On 23 February 2011, he played his second game against Myanmar.

He made his senior team debut and scored his first goal for India in a 3–0 win over Chinese Taipei on 21 March 2011 after coming on as a substitute .

Career statistics

Club
Statistics accurate as of 20 November 2015

International Goals

Honours

India
 SAFF Championship: 2011; runner-up: 2013
 Nehru Cup: 2012

India U23
 SAFF Championship: 2009

References

External links
 http://www.goal.com/en-india/people/india/28278/shaikh-raja
 https://web.archive.org/web/20111121141050/http://mohunbaganac.com/SEPT08/playerdetails.php?playerId=142

Living people
1990 births
I-League players
Indian footballers
India international footballers
India youth international footballers
Indian Arrows players
Dempo SC players
Mohun Bagan AC players
People from Budge Budge
Footballers from Kolkata
FC Goa players
ATK (football club) players
Indian Super League players
Association football midfielders
Footballers at the 2010 Asian Games
Asian Games competitors for India